Sir John Eden, 2nd Baronet (1677–1728) was a British politician who sat in the House of Commons from 1713 to 1727.

Eden was the eldest son of Sir Robert Eden, 1st Baronet, of West Auckland and his wife Margaret Lambton, daughter of John Lambton of Durham and was baptized on 11 September 1677. He matriculated at Queen's College, Oxford on 25 February 1695. He married Catherine Shafto, daughter of Mark Shafto of Whitworth, county Durham on 31 January 1715 and was given Windlestone Hall on the occasion.

Eden was returned unopposed as Member of Parliament  for County Durham in succession to his father at the 1713 general election. He was also Mayor of Hartlepool for the year1714–15.   He was returned unopposed again at the 1715 general election. He succeeded to the baronetcy on the death of his father on 30 March 1721. At the 1722 general election he won the seat at Durham in a contest, but only because of dissention between his opposing Whig candidates.  He was mayor of Hartlepool again for the year 1722–1723. He did not stand for Durham in 1727 when his opponents had patched up their differences.
   
Eden died at Bath on 2 May 1728 and was succeeded in the baronetcy by his only son Robert.

References

1677 births
1728 deaths
British MPs 1713–1715
British MPs 1715–1722
British MPs 1722–1727
Members of the Parliament of Great Britain for English constituencies
Baronets in the Baronetage of England